Pettit is an unincorporated community located in Daviess County, Kentucky, United States. It is named for Thomas S. Pettit, the long-time publisher of The Monitor (now the Messenger-Inquirer), who helped clear and improve the land that the community now occupies.

References

Unincorporated communities in Daviess County, Kentucky
Unincorporated communities in Kentucky